Antoin Sevruguin (1851–1933) was an Iranian photographer of Armenian-Georgian descent, in Persia during the reign of the Qajar dynasty (1785–1925).

Early life
Born into a Russian family of Armenian-Georgian origin in the Russian embassy of Tehran, Iran: Antoin Sevruguin was one of the many children of Vasily Sevryugin and a Georgian "Ms. Ashin". Vasily Sevryugin (or Vassil de Sevruguin) was a Russian diplomat to Tehran. Achin had raised her children in Tbilisi, Georgia, because she was denied her husband's pension. After Vassil died in a horse riding accident Antoin gave up the art form of painting, and took up photography to support his family. His brothers Kolia and Emanuel helped him set up a studio in Tehran on Ala al-dawla Street (today Ferdowsi St.).

Celebrity

Many of Antoin's photographs were taken from 1870-1930. Because Sevruguin spoke Persian as well as other languages, he was capable of communicating to different social strata and tribes from his country Iran. His photos of the royal court, harems, and mosques and other religious monuments were compared to the other Western photographers in Persia. The reigning Shah, Nasir al-Din Shah (reigned from 1846–1896) took a special interest in photography and many royal buildings and events were portrayed by Sevruguin.

Landscape photography
Because Sevruguin travelled Persia and took pictures of the country, his travels record the Iran as it was in his time. Sevruguins pictures show Tehran as a small city. They show monuments, bridges and landscapes which have changed since then.

Ethnographical photography
Some of Sevruguin's portraiture fed preexisting stereotypes of Easterners but nevertheless had a commercial value and today prove to be historical records of regional dress.
Photographic studios in the nineteenth century advertised a type of picture known in French as "types". These were portraits of typical ethnic groups and their occupation. They informed the European viewer, unfamiliar with Persian culture, about the looks of regional dress, handcraft, religion and professions. Photographing regional costumes was an accepted method of ethnological research in the nineteenth century. Many European ethnological museums bought Sevruguins portraiture to complement their scientific collection. Museums collected pictures of merchants in the bazaar, members of a zurkhana (a wrestling school), dervishes, gatherings of crowds to see the taziyeh theatre, people engaged in shiite rituals and more. Sevruguins portraits were also spread as postcards with the text: 'Types persans'.
Sevruguin was a photographer who had no boundaries in portraying people of all sorts of social classes and ethnic backgrounds. He portrayed members of the Persian royal family as well as beggars, fellow countrymen of Iran or Westerners, farmers working fields, womenweavers at work, army officers, religious officials, Zoroastrians, Armenians, Lurs, Georgians, Kurds, Shasavan, Assyrians, and Gilak.

Sevruguin's photographic studio
Many Westerners who lived in Persia and travellers who visited the country brought back pictures from Sevruguin, mentioning him in travelogues of the time. Sevruguin's photographic studio was located on the Avenue Ala al-Dawla and was not the only photographic studio in this street. Local people could have their picture taken in this studio as well. They could pose in front of a painted backdrop. Most pictures were taken as a glass negative and printed out as an albumen print. Often a logo with Sevruguin's name was printed on one side of the picture. Many 19th century tourists misspelled his name, finding it difficult to spell it in Western languages: Sevraguine, Sevrugin, Sevriogin, Segruvian, and Serunian for example. His name was phonetically spelled Sevr-joe-gien.

Vandalism
In 1908 the world was denied the rich collection of Sevruguin's images when Cossacks of Mohammad Ali Shah Qajar (reigned from 1907–1909) inadvertently bombed his store in suppression of Zahiru’d-Dawla, the constitutionalist Governor of Rasht. His house along with the whole street was burned.

Up to that point Antoin had seven thousand plus photographs. Only two thousand were salvaged. As the photographs depicted numerous figures associated with the former Qajar regime and showed "conditions far removed from his own notions of a modern westernized nation", Reza Shah Pahlavi (reigned from 1925–1941) confiscated the remaining images.

Legacy
After his death from a kidney infection, Sevruguin's images resurfaced. He was survived by seven children from his marriage to Louise Gourgenian. 

In 1951–1952, an American historian of Iranian Islamic architecture, Myron Bement Smith, learned that 692 plates on glass by Sevrugian were up for sale at the American Presbyterian Mission in Tehran. Smith bought the images for $200 USD, and when he died, this window Katharine Smith donated the photo plates archive to the Smithsonian Institution. Only 696 of Sevruguin's negatives survive today.

The small exhibit curated by Massumeh Farhad, "Antoin Sevruguin and the Persian Image" (2001) was held at the Sackler Museum of Harvard University. The Runa Islam exhibition “Projects 95: Runa Islam” (2011) at the Museum of Modern Art (MoMA) featured the work "Emergence" (2011), that had been derived from one of Sevruguin's images.

Gallery

References

Sources
 L.A. Ferydoun Barjesteh van Waalwijk van Doorn, Gillian M.Vogelsang-Eastwood (eds.), Sevruguin's Iran / Iran az negah Sevruguin, Late nineteenth century photographs of Iran from the National Museum of Ethnology in Leiden, Netherlands, Teheran/Rotterdam 1378/1999.
 Bohrer, Frederick N., ED. Sevruguin and the Persian Image. London: University of Washington Press, 1999.
 Iraj Afshar, ‘Some remarks on the early history of photography in Iran’ in Qajar Iran; political, social and cultural change, 1800-1925, E.Bosworth, C. Hillenbrand (eds.), Edinburgh 1983, pp. 262–2.
 Iraj Afshar, Ganjine-ye aks-haye Iran. hamrah-e tarikhche-ye vorud-e akkasi be Iran, A treasury of early Iranian Photographs together with a concise account of how photography was first introduced in Iran, Teheran 1371/1992.
 Exhibition of Antoin Sevruguin's Photographs (Archived 2009-10-25) at geocities.com
 Myron Bement Smith Collection, Subseries 2.12: Antoin Sevruguin Photographs
 Stephen Arpee Collection of Sevruguin Photographs

Further reading

External links 

 Sevruguin's Images of the Orient: Cultural Migrants Between Armenia and Persia
 Antoin Sevruguin Photographs, Freer Gallery of Art and Arthur M. Sackler Gallery Archives, Smithsonian Institution, Washington D.C., U.S.A.
Antoin Sevruguin photographs of Persia, 1880s-1890s, Getty Research Institute, Los Angeles. Accession No. 2017.R.25. The 97 photographs in this collection are representative of Antoin Sevruguin's all-encompassing documentation of Persia, and comprise a mixture of studio portraits, outdoor vernacular scenes and landscapes.

1851 births
1933 deaths
Iranian photographers
Iranian people of Georgian descent
Iranian people of Russian descent
Persian Armenians
People from Tehran
People of Qajar Iran
Burials at Doulab Cemetery